The name Orlene has been used for six tropical cyclones in the Eastern Pacific Ocean:

 Tropical Storm Orlene (1970) – hit eastern Oaxaca
 Hurricane Orlene (1974) – made landfall in northwestern Mexico; continuation of Hurricane Fifi which crossed from the Atlantic into the Pacific
 Hurricane Orlene (1986) – remained far from land
 Hurricane Orlene (1992) – made landfall on the Big Island of Hawaii as a tropical depression
 Hurricane Orlene (2016) – never threatened land
 Hurricane Orlene (2022) – struck southern Sinaloa

Pacific hurricane set index articles